Purranisaurus is an extinct genus of marine crocodyliform from the Middle to Late Jurassic period of Chile and Vaca Muerta of Argentina. Rusconi originally regarded Purranisaurus potens (the type species) to be a plesiosaur; however, Gasparini demonstrated that it was in fact a metriorhynchid crocodyliform, and that may be a junior synonym of Metriorhynchus.

Taxonomy and phylogeny 
 
In the 2000s phylogenetic analysis has shown that Purranisaurus is a distinct metriorhynchid genus. A subsequent study expanded the genus Purranisaurus to include Metriorhynchus casamiquelai and M. westermanni. Following the re-description of the holotype of the type species, only that species is now referred to Purranisaurus.

References 

Prehistoric pseudosuchian genera
Prehistoric marine crocodylomorphs
Jurassic crocodylomorphs
Jurassic Argentina
Fossils of Argentina
Neuquén Basin
Jurassic Chile
Fossils of Chile
Fossil taxa described in 1948